Queanbeyan East is a suburb of Queanbeyan in New South Wales, Australia. It is on the north eastern side of the Queanbeyan River, with the river forming its western boundary.

Geography 
The suburb is a mixed residential and industrial zone, incorporating Queanbeyan's (and one of the region's largest) manufacturing and general industrial hubs along the eastern length of Yass Road.

East Queanbeyan is predominantly residential however, featuring a mix of high density units and free standing homes.  In recent years a number of new mini housing estates have been completed (or are under construction), adding significantly to the population, and providing new housing stock.  Additionally a new high density residential complex has been completed adjacent to the Queanbeyan River.

The Goulburn-Bombala railway passes from east to west through the north of the suburb.

Amenities 
The suburb contains a small general shopping strip, consisting of several major brand outlets.  Queanbeyan East Public School and Queanbeyan TAFE both reside in East Queanbeyan, as do a number of significant and popular playing grounds, including the city's largest sports ground, Seiffert Oval.  The suburb is notable for the number of playing grounds and general parkland within it.

Additionally, East Queanbeyan is home to a lawn bowls club, a number of restaurants, several motels, and borders the Queanbeyan Golf Club.

The Airport Motor Inn lies just inside the city, close by the railway line which forms the border with the Australian Capital Territory.

Heritage listings 
Queanbeyan East has a number of heritage-listed sites, including:

 Goulburn-Bombala railway: Queanbeyan railway bridge

References

External links
 A map of Queanbeyan Suburbs courtesy of Queanbeyan City Council

Queanbeyan